Chanthaly (Lao: ຈັນທະລີ) is a 2012 Lao horror film directed by Mattie Do and written by Christopher Larsen. It is the first horror film to be written and directed entirely in Laos and the first Lao feature film directed by a woman. Chanthaly was screened at the 2012 Luang Prabang Film Festival and the 2013 Fantastic Fest. Pop singer Amphaiphun Phimmapunya stars in the leading role as Chanthaly, alongside Douangmany Soliphanh and Soukchinda Duangkhamchan.

Plot
Chanthaly is being raised alone by her overprotective father, sequestered in their home in Vientiane. She suspects that her dead mother's ghost is trying to deliver a message to her from the afterlife. After a change in the medication treating her hereditary heart condition causes the hallucinations to cease, Chanthaly must decide whether or not to risk succumbing to her terminal illness to hear her mother's last words.

Cast
 Amphaiphun Phimmapunya as Chanthaly
 Douangmany Soliphanh as Father
 Soukchinda Duangkhamchan as Thong
 Khouan Souliyabapha as Bee
 Soulasath Souvanavong as Keovisit
 Mango as Moo

Production
The entire film was shot at director Mattie Do's house in Vientiane, Laos.

Entering into public domain and "open sourcing"
During a crowd funding campaign for Do's second feature film Dearest Sister, Do and Larsen, who are the sole owner of the copyright, offered to enter the film into the public domain if a US$30,000 goal was reached. After reaching the goal, in addition to releasing the copyright, all raw footage and other production material was made available through the Internet Archive and the torrent site EZTV, thus "open sourcing" the entire project.

Do put forth a "community challenge", inviting fans to re-edit the film using the material.

References

External links
 
 

Laotian films
2012 films
2012 horror films
Films directed by Mattie Do